Kasejovice is a town in Plzeň-South District in the Plzeň Region of the Czech Republic. It has about 1,300 inhabitants.

Administrative parts
Villages of Chloumek, Kladrubce, Podhůří, Polánka, Přebudov, Řesanice and Újezd u Kasejovic are administrative parts of Kasejovice.

Notable people
Wenceslas Bojer (1795–1856), botanist and traveller

References

External links

Cities and towns in the Czech Republic
Populated places in Plzeň-South District
Prácheňsko